The campaign at the China–Burma border was a series of battles fought along the China–Burma border after the Chinese Civil War, with the communist People's Republic of China (PRC) and the Union of Burma on one side and the nationalist forces of the Republic of China (ROC) on the other. The government of the PRC refers to the campaign as the China–Burma border demarcation and security operation.

Background 

After the 1949 Chinese Communist Revolution, some surviving nationalist forces withdrew to Burma and continued to fight. Under international pressure, the nationalist government in Taiwan withdrew its surviving forces (totalling over 6,500 troops) on the China–Burma border in May 1954. However, many ardent nationalists refused to retreat to Taiwan and decided to stay in Burma to continue the anti-communist fight. To better lead these troops, the Nationalist government sent the original deputy commander-in-chief, Liu Yuanlin, back to Burma to form the Yunnan People's Anti-communist Volunteer Army in June 1954. By the early 1960s, the nationalist force in northern Burma had reached its peak, totalling nearly ten thousand troops. Because there were a much higher proportion of officers among the nationalist force in the China–Burma border, the structure of nationalist forces in northern Burma differed from ordinary military structure: the Yunnan People's Anti-communist Volunteer Army was organised into five armies, each consisting of two to three divisions. Each of these divisions consisted of two to three regiments, and the brigade-level structure was eliminated. The size of each regiment of Yunnan People's Anti-communist Volunteer Army varied greatly in size, from two dozen troops to over a thousand troops. The nationalist force controlled an area along the China–Burma border that was 300 km long and 100 km deep. The nationalist area of control was typically mountainous jungle regions, in which the rainy season lasted six months and the area was covered by fog for the majority of the year. Because there were few roads and trails and the natural environment was very harsh, it was extremely difficult to navigate in the region.

On 28 January 1960, Burmese premier Ne Win visited China and signed a deal aiming to solve the historical disputes between China and Burma. In October 1960, Burmese prime minister U Nu and Burmese chief-of-general-staff Ne Win visited China once again; on 1 October 1960, they signed a new border treaty with Chinese premier Zhou Enlai. Before the border treaty was signed, both sides agreed in May 1960 to jointly eradicate the Chinese nationalist force in the border region. The treaty's requirement to survey of the China–Burma border for demarcation provided reasons for the following military actions.

Prelude 
In October 1960, the communist high command ordered the Kunming Military Region to prepare for the campaign. In early November 1960, communists and the Burmese government held a joint conference on the matter of the communist force fighting in Burma. The Burmese representatives were headed by Brigadier Generals Aung Gyi and San Yu, and the Chinese communist representatives were headed by Ding Rongchang, the deputy commander-in-chief of the communist Yunnan Provincial Military Region, and Cheng Xueyu, the director of the Border Defense Directorate of the War Department of the General Staff Ministry of the People's Liberation Army. By 4 November 1960, a deal was signed in which communist forces were allowed to fight in Burma in a region that was 20 km deep and 300 km long along the border.

On 14 November 1960, the communist central military committee formally issued the order to cross the border to destroy the Nationalist troops in Burma, according to the personal direction of Zhou Enlai. The political implication of the campaign was especially emphasised and failure was not an option. The communist force would be mainly deployed in the Mengma, Mengwa and Sandao regions. The communists intended to avoid scattering the enemy; they instead wanted to completely annihilate the enemy by first cutting off the retreat route of the nationalists in a surprise attack. There were also restrictions placed on the communists' actions: for example, if the nationalists were to retreat towards the Burma–Laos–Thailand border, the communist forces could not give chase on their own, they would have to coordinate with Burmese government first, just as in any unexpected situation. Local civilian casualties were to be avoided at all costs. After receiving the order, the communist Kunming Military Region decided to mobilise five infantry regiments and militias totalling over 6,500 for the campaign, including a regiment from the 39th Division of the 13th Army, a regiment of the 40th Division of the 14th Army, and three border defence regiments. To better coordinate their actions in Burma, the communist forces formed a frontline command at Fohai in early November 1960. Li Xifu, the commander-in-chief of the communist Yunnan Provincial Military Region, was named as the commander-in-chief of the new frontline command. Ding Rongchang and Cui Jiangong, the deputy commander of the communist 13th Army, were named as the deputy commanders-in-chief of the new frontline command.

Order of battle 
The surviving nationalist force at the China–Burma border peaked in the early 1960s, totalling almost ten thousand troops, excluding their noncombatant family members. The nationalist force was divided into five armies, which were each responsible for an area. In addition to the five areas of responsibility of the five armies, there were also the Ximeng Military Region and Mengbailiao Garrison Region. The communists mobilized 6,500 troops, out of which 4,500 were deployed during the campaign.

Nationalist order of battle 
Yunnan People's Anticommunist Volunteer Army (commander-in-chief: Liu Yuanlin,)
 1st Army headquartered at Mengwa, commanded by Wu Yunnuan
 2nd Army headquartered at Suoyong, commanded by Wu Zubo
 3rd Army headquartered at Laidong, commanded by Li Wenhuan
 4th Army headquartered at Mengma, commanded by Zhang Weicheng
 5th Army headquartered at Menglong, commanded by Duan Xiwen

Communist order of battle 
 117th Regiment of the 39th Division of the 13th Army
 118th Regiment of the 40th Division of the 14th Army
 116th Regiment
 9th Border Defense Regiment of Yunnan Simao Military Sub-region
 10th Border Defense Regiment of Yunnan Simao Military Sub-region
 11th Border Defense Regiment of Yunnan Simao Military Sub-region
 Militia units

Strategies 
Both sides were limited by various factors. Due to their low numbers, the nationalists adopted the strategy of avoiding fighting any large-scale battles, instead concentrating on preserving their own strength. In the event of communist offensive, they would quickly withdraw away from the China–Burma border. The communists, however, were limited by the redline that restricted their actions, which eventually resulted in the successful escape of most of the nationalist forces to the Laos–Thailand border.

Nationalist strategy 
The nationalist frontline bordering China was 300 km long and 20 km deep and was the main target of the communist offensive. There were a total of 22 nationalist strongholds in the region, which comprised the headquarters of the nationalist 1st and 4th Armies, 2nd Division, 3rd Division, 5th Division, 6th Division, eight regimental headquarters, and eight guerrilla strike teams. The nationalist force in the region totalled more than 800 troops and was divided into three lines of defence. The first line of defence was manned by the 1st Army and its 3rd Division. It totalled over 150 troops and was stationed in various nationalist strongholds, including Mengwa, Mengyu, Mengjing, and Jingkang. With the exception of Jingkang, all of the nationalist strongholds in the first line of defence faced the Southern Luo River and had hilly forest to their rear. All of the roads and trails to and from China in the region were heavily mined. The nationalist 4th Army deployed to the south and east of Mengyong was the backbone of the nationalist 2nd line of defence, and its 35th Regiment (totalling over 200 soldiers) was stationed at the critical peak 1404. The Mengbailiao and Jiangle regions were the nationalist 3rd line of defence; the general headquarters of the nationalist commander-in-chief Liu Yuanlin were setup in Mengbailiao, with the training group, garrison regiment and communication battalion totalling over 450 troops. The Jiangle region was the nationalist logistic headquarters. It totalled over 200 troops, including the 1st Training Group.

Communist strategy 
The communists divided the combat zone into smaller individual areas and planned to cut off the retreating routes of the nationalists. The 117th Regiment and a portion of the 116th Regiment of the 39th Division of the Communist 13th Army were tasked with destroying the headquarters of the nationalist 4th Army at Mengma, the nationalist 6th Division, 2nd Division, 5th Regiment, 17th Regiment and 4 guerrilla strike teams, totalling 439 troops. In reality, the communists overestimated the nationalist strength, which only totalled 334 troops. The 118th Regiment of the 40th Division of the communist 14th Army was tasked with destroying the headquarters of the nationalist 1st Army at Mengwa (孟瓦), the garrison battalion, the headquarters of the nationalist 3rd Division, the 8th Regiment, the 9th Regiment, and a guerrilla strike team totalling 265 troops. Once again, the communists overestimated the nationalist strength, which only totalled 156 troops.

The 11th Border Defense Regiment of the communist Yunnan Simao Military Sub-region was tasked with destroying the nationalist 7th Regiment and a guerrilla strike team totalling 59 troops, but the communist intelligence had underestimated the nationalist strength, which totalled 81 troops. The 9th and 10th Border Defense Regiments of the communist Yunnan Simao Military Sub-region were tasked with destroying the headquarters of the nationalist 5th Division at Barbarians' Nest (Manwo), the 14th Regiment, the 1st Regiment and two guerrilla strike teams totalling 159 troops. The communist intelligence had again underestimated the nationalist strength, which actually totalled 171 troops. The communists mobilised a total of 6,639 troops of their own, though not all of them had crossed the border. They divided their forces into 22 routes and would cross the border to attack in the early morning of 22 November 1960.

First stage 
The communist 2nd Company of the 9th Regiment of Border Defense and the 2nd Company of the 10th Regiment of Border Defense, who were tasked to attack nationalist strongholds at Man'enai, reached their target by 5:00 AM on 22 November 1960. However, the numerically inferior nationalist troops had just learned of the upcoming attack and retreated, abandoning the stronghold. The communists' main force immediately sent out four companies to chase the retreating nationalists and caught up with them around ten kilometres south of the stronghold. After the ensuing battles (including mop-up operations), thirty-three nationalist troops, including Li Tai, the commander of the nationalist 5th Division, were killed, destroying the nationalist garrison of the Man'enai stronghold. Meanwhile, the communist force consisting of the 117th infantry regiment under the command of Yan Shouqing (阎守庆), the deputy commander of the 39th Division, the 118th infantry regiment under the command of Zhao Shiying, the commander of the 40th Division, and the 1st Battalion of the 116th infantry regiment, attacked nationalist positions in Mengwa and Mengma. The outnumbered nationalist force at those positions were no match with an enemy that enjoyed overwhelmingly superior numbers and firepower. The communist 117th infantry regiment succeeded in completely wiping out a sixty-member strong nationalist battalion at the Tabanmai stronghold and the sixty-two member strong nationalist battalion of the 7th Regiment at the Mengxie stronghold. Major General Meng Baoye and Colonel Meng Xian, the commander and deputy commander of the nationalist 2nd Division, were both killed in action. Meanwhile, the communist 118th infantry regiment attacked nationalist positions at Mengwa, Jingkang, Mengyu, and Mengjing, succeeding in killing over a hundred nationalist troops and capturing Colonel Ye Wenqiang, the deputy commander of the nationalist 3rd Division.

After several hours of fierce battle, some nationalist headquarters were destroyed. However, due to their complete lack of experience in jungle warfare in the mountainous region, half of the six communist task forces assigned to outflank the targets failed to reach their destination on time. As a result, the communists only managed to annihilate nationalist forces at six out of the original sixteen targets; the rest of the nationalist forces slipped away. The subsequent mop-up operation ended on 20 December 1960, marking the end of the first stage of the campaign. A total of 467 nationalist troops were killed in the region bounded by the redline, or only 53.4 per cent of the original target set by the communists. After the operation, the Burmese government asked the communist force to stay in Burma to guard the local region against possible nationalist counterattacks. Zhou Enlai, the Chinese premier, agreed, and ordered the Chinese communist troops to stay until the demarcation was completed.

Second stage 
After the first stage of the campaign concluded, the surviving nationalists decided that their strength was no match for the superior communist force and that it was best to avoid confrontation with the enemy to conserve their strength. Instead, to make up territory lost to the communists in the first stage of the campaign, nationalists would gain control over territory from the Burmese government by attacking Burmese troops. Burmese troops could not check the nationalist advance, so on the evening of 18 January 1961, Burmese liaison officers asked Chinese communists for help on behalf of the Burmese government. The communists decided to mobilise over 5,800 troops to launch the second stage of the campaign in late January to attack nationalists beyond the redline. The communists and the Burmese government reached a deal allowing the communist force to operate another 50 km beyond the redline to engage the three thousand nationalist troops in the Suoyong (索永) and Mengbailiao (孟白了) regions. To better coordinate their actions, the communists established their frontline headquarters in Fohai (佛海), with deputy commander Cui Jiangong (崔建功) of the 13th Army as the commander, and chief-of-staff Liang Zhongyu (梁中玉) of the 14th Army and deputy director of the political directorate Duan Siying (段思英) as deputy commanders.

The communist 117th Regiment leading the 2,966 strong attacking force was tasked with attacking the surviving units of the nationalist 4th Army, the 2nd Division, the 9th Division, the 10th Division, the 11th Division, the 7th Group of the Training Column, and the Heavy Weaponry Group, totalling over 1,200 troops. Another communist force consisting of the 10th Regiment and the 11th Regiment of the Border Defense of the Simao Military Sub-region totalling 1,420 was tasked with attacking the surviving nationalist forces totalling more than 680, including the surviving forces of the nationalist general headquarters in Suoyong (索永), the headquarters of the 2nd Army in Baka (八卡), the headquarters of 1st Army at the Daling (大棱) River crossing point, the 3rd Division, the 8th Division, and the Zhongka (中卡) Squadron. The largest communist force, totalling 3,012 and headed by the communist 118th Regiment, was tasked to attack the surviving units of over 1,200 nationalists, including those from the southern frontline command headquarters, garrison regiment, training column (without its 7th Group), 2nd Group of the Training Column, 35th Regiment of the 3rd Army, and Officer Training Regiment.

On 25 January 1961, all communist units began their assault by crossing the redline and attacking the regions to the north and west of the Mekong River. Nationalist commander-in-chief Liu Yuanlin realised the communist objective and immediately ordered a general retreat toward the Burma–Laos border under the cover of darkness on the very same night, abandoning the base they had controlled for more than a decade. By the next day, nationalist strongholds including Baxili, (巴西里), Suoyong (索永), and Mengbailiao (孟白了) fell into the communist hands and the nationalist rear-guards in charge of covering the retreat of the main force were destroyed. The communist force subsequently performed search-and-destroy operations to eradicate the surviving nationalists in the newly-taken region, succeeding in killing the nationalist director of the political directorate Colonel Li Zixiong and Colonel Bai Xianglin, a regimental commander. However, except for the communist force of the Simao Military Sub-region, which reached its destination of Baxili, on time, numerous problems caused all other communist forces to fail to reach their planned destination on time, resulting in the killing of only 274 nationalist troops. In addition to successfully escaping to their new destination, several hundred kilometres away in the border region of Burma–Laos–Thailand, the retreating nationalists also successfully managed to transport most of their equipment, supplies, and wounded with them in their escape. On 9 February 1961, the second stage concluded when all communist units withdrew back to China, marking the end of the campaign.

Outcome 
The communists succeeded in driving the nationalists from their base they had held for more than a decade, thus returning control of an over-30,000 square kilometre area with a population of over 100,000 to the Burmese government. However, the campaign also revealed serious and huge shortcomings of the communist troop in jungle warfare, and, due to these problems revealed later in the communist post-war analysis, most of the retreating nationalists were able to successfully escape to Laos–Thailand border several hundred kilometres away, forming a new base that survived until the second stage. The nationalists, despite losing their 30,000 square kilometre base, nonetheless managed to retain most of their troops (around 90 per cent) and equipment to successfully escape and establish new bases in the new area. However, the new area was far less fertile than the land in their original base; this forced the nationalists to increasingly depend on opium production and trade. Most of their area of control eventually became part of the infamous Golden Triangle.

Aftermath 
The opportunity to fight a campaign in an unfamiliar area exposed many communist problems that were nearly impossible to detect during peacetime. The communists concluded that the fighting capability of their troops had significantly decreased merely a decade after the nationalists had been driven from mainland China. Furthermore, the previous experience that had helped them to secure the victory over the nationalists in mainland China was completely ill-suited for modern jungle warfare and many problems urgently needed to be addressed, including:
 The complete lack of understanding of the local environment: there were numerous rivers, valleys, steep slopes, high mountain peaks in the rugged terrain, while roads were nearly nonexistent. The jungle was dense and the local area was rife with disease. These factors were overlooked during the communists' planning, which was based on much more navigable mountainous terrain in China. As a result, none of the communist units were able to reach their destination on time during the first stage, and during the second stage, the average speed the communist force achieved in the jungle was only 300 metres per hour.
 An inability to cross rivers rapidly: the hastily prepared river training only consisted of some swimming lessons for the troops, which proved to be totally inadequate. The slow speed of river crossings was a major factor that stopped communist sieges, which were supposed to encircle the nationalists, but could not form in time, thus allowing the retreating nationalist troops to escape.
 Application of outdated experience: the officers of the World War II and Chinese Civil War era applied their past guerrilla experience to modern conventional jungle warfare, which prevented communists from achieving their goals. For example, not only did the communist forces lack local maps of the region, many commanders did not know how to read modern maps when they were available. As a result, troops were often completely lost in the jungle after travelling only a short distance from the border. The earlier battle experience of a decade ago was not applicable to fill the experience gaps in jungle warfare.
 Disorganised formation: many officers were hastily sent to units they had never seen and thus didn't know the true strength and weakness of the units they commanded in the campaign. As a result, some orders were simply beyond a unit's ability to achieve, while other orders restricted the full combat potential of the units.
 Lack of necessary equipment needed for jungle warfare: the standard Soviet-type gear was completely ill-suited for jungle warfare, so there was a need to deploy new equipment, including for river crossing, road building, and medical gear for jungle warfare, but such equipment did not exist. This was the primary reason that non-combat casualties were several times higher than combat casualties.
 Poor tactics: most tactics devised by the staff officers were derived from mountainous warfare tactics developed in the arid region in China, which proved to be inadequate in the humid jungle warfare. Combined with the lack of equipment, the knowledge of the enemy was poor if not non-existent, resulting in miscommunications such as overestimation of enemy strength.
 Inability to take initiatives: due to the relative peacetime after the war, some officers lost their original tenacity and ability to take initiatives: when encountering the enemy force, these officers took much more prudent approach of securing their own position first and wait for reinforcement instead of promptly attacking the enemy. However, most of the supposed formidable enemy strength turned out to be exaggerated due to miscommunications, lack of equipment, and poor tactics mentioned above. In fact, there were occasions where the commanders refused to follow the order to pursue the retreating enemy after the order was given twice, believing the erroneous intelligence that greatly exaggerated the enemy strength.
The communists were shocked by the shortcomings exposed in the campaign. The deputy chief-of-staff and future 1980s Chinese defence minister Zhang Aiping and the commander-in-chief of Kunming Military Region and future 1990s Chinese defence minister Qin Jiwei (秦基伟) were sent to lead a team to establish new training and tactics based on the experience gained in the campaign to correct the problems. As a result, the militaries of both the Kunming Military Region and Guangzhou Military Region were drastically upgraded and improved in a very short time after massive efforts. The improvements later proved to be vital when Chinese troops were deployed to North Vietnam and Laos as part of Chinese involvement in the Vietnam War.

See also 
 Kuomintang in Burma
 Kuomintang Islamic insurgency (1950–1958)
 1967 Opium War

References

Citations

Sources

External links 
 Operation Paper: The United States and Drugs in Thailand and Burma

1960 in China
1961 in China
Campaigns of the Chinese Civil War
China–Myanmar border
China–Myanmar relations
Conflicts in 1960
Conflicts in 1961
Military history of Taiwan
Military history of Yunnan
Wars involving China
Wars involving Myanmar